The N. S. Nielson House is a historic house in Mount Pleasant, Utah. It was built in 1892 for N. S. Nielson, an immigrant from Sweden who converted to the Church of Jesus Christ of Latter-day Saints and settled in Utah in 1868. Nielson became a large sheep farmer. He was also president of the Mount Pleasant Commercial and Savings Bank, and the mayor of Mount Pleasant from 1896 to 1897. His house was designed in the Victorian Eclectic architectural style, with Second Empire, Queen Anne, and Beaux-Arts Classical features, and a "two-story square tower with a bell-cast mansard roof." It has been listed on the National Register of Historic Places since July 26, 1982.

References

		
National Register of Historic Places in Sanpete County, Utah
Victorian architecture in Utah
Houses completed in 1892
1892 establishments in Utah Territory